789 Lena, provisional designation , is a metallic asteroid from the middle region of the asteroid belt, approximately 24 kilometers in diameter. It was discovered on 24 June 1914, by Soviet–Russian astronomer Grigory Neujmin at Simeiz Observatory on the Crimean peninsula, and named after the discoverer's mother.

Orbit and classification 

Lena orbits the Sun in the middle main-belt at a distance of 2.3–3.1 AU once every 4 years and 5 months (1,608 days). Its orbit has an eccentricity of 0.15 and an inclination of 11° with respect to the ecliptic. Lenas observation arc begins with its first used observation made at Yerkes Observatory in 1935, or 21 years after its official discovery observation at Simeiz.

Although its orbital elements resemble those of the asteroids in the Eunomia family, true members of this family have a S-type composition, so it is almost certainly an unrelated interloper.

Physical characteristics 

In the SMASS taxonomy, Lena is an X-type asteroid. It has also been characterized as a metallic M-type asteroid by NASA's Wide-field Infrared Survey Explorer (WISE).

Rotation period 

In 1993, a rotational lightcurve which was later proven incorrect, was obtained from photometric observations at the Félix Aguilar Observatory, Argentina. It gave an unusual lightcurve, indicating a very irregular shape and/or a relatively long rotation period of 22 hours with an exceptionally high amplitude of 1.5 in magnitude.

In August and September 2007, two reliable lightcurves were obtained by Italian astronomer Silvano Casulli and by members at the U.S.Oakley Observatory.

Diameter and albedo 

According to the space-based surveys carried out by the Japanese Akari satellite and the NEOWISE mission of the WISE telescope, Lena measures between 20.6 and 23.9 kilometers in diameter, and its surface has an albedo of 0.137–0.186. The Collaborative Asteroid Lightcurve Link assumes a much lower albedo of 0.10 and calculates a diameter of 24.2 kilometer, as the lower the albedo (reflectivity), the larger a body's diameter, at a constant absolute magnitude (brightness).

Naming 

This minor planet was named in honor of Elena ("Lena") Petrovna Neujmina (1860–1942), mother of the discovering astronomer Grigory Neujmin.

Notes

References

External links 
 Asteroid Lightcurve Database (LCDB), query form (info )
 Dictionary of Minor Planet Names, Google books
 Asteroids and comets rotation curves, CdR – Observatoire de Genève, Raoul Behrend
 Discovery Circumstances: Numbered Minor Planets (1)-(5000) – Minor Planet Center
 
 

000789
Discoveries by Grigory Neujmin
Named minor planets
000789
19140624